Randwick North High School was an Australian co-educational high school which operated from 1966 to 2001 in the suburb of Randwick, New South Wales. The site is now home to Randwick Public School and Centennial Park School.

History
The history of Randwick North High dates back to 1883, when Randwick Public School was established by the  NSW Government. The school, to accommodate 200 students, was built on land at the top of Avoca Street, Randwick in 1886. This building was to form part of Randwick North High School. The senior functions of the school became a Superior Public School in 1913, a Junior High School in 1944 and finally split between Girls and Boys High Schools in 1949, who eventually moved further south down Avoca street. The primary school operated from their buildings on Cowper Street which was completed in 1924, which grew steadily and frequent building additions were made.

To accommodate increasing student enrolments in the Randwick area in the 1950s-60s, a new co-educational high school was planned for the former site of Randwick High School in between Randwick Town Hall and Public School. This became Randwick North High School, which was opened in 1966. During the 1970s, the school staff included executive members of the New South Wales Teachers Federation Rosemary Child and Don Hayward. The school staff were at the forefront of industrial action to secure better conditions for students.

Randwick North was closed in 2001 and the site was divided between the Open High School Sydney and Randwick Public School. In 2018, the Open High School moved to Petersham (as the NSW School of Languages). The Randwick site is now shared by Randwick Public School and Centennial Park School.

Notable alumni 
 Corey Adamsrugby league player and lifeguard
 Jennifer Bettsmagistrate of the Local Court of New South Wales
 Scott Benjamin Gracieauthor
 Sujata Bose Sinhaassistant professor of Rust College
 Simon Boudatelevision journalist for Nine News Sydney
 Greg Hilderauthor
 Mark MaclureAustralian football player
 Theo Onisforoulawyer, property developer and multimillionaire 
 Karin Sowadaformer Australian Democrats Senator

Former staff
 Barry Collier former Member for Miranda
Russell Fairfaxrugby union and rugby league player and coach
 Bob Outtersiderugby union international player and coach
 Jane Zemiroacademic and author, mother of Julia Zemiro

References

External links
School anthem at National Library of Australia
Heritage study

Defunct public high schools in Sydney
Educational institutions established in 1966
Educational institutions disestablished in 2001
1966 establishments in Australia
Randwick, New South Wales
2001 disestablishments in Australia